Joseph Anton Feuchtmayer (6 March 1696 (baptized) – 2 January 1770) was an important Rococo stuccoist and sculptor, active in southern Germany and Switzerland.

J. A. Feuchtmayer was born in Linz, a member of the famous Feuchtmayer family of the Wessobrunner School. He was the son of Franz Joseph Feuchtmayer (1660–1718); the nephew of Johann Michael Feuchtmayer (the Elder) and Michael Feuchtmayer (b. 1667); the first cousin of Franz Xaver Feuchtmayer (the Elder) (1705–1764) and Johann Michael Feuchtmayer (the Younger) (1709–1772); and the first cousin once removed of Franz Xaver Feuchtmayer (the Younger) (b. 1735).

Joseph Anton began studying sculpture in Augsburg in 1715 and did work in Weingarten starting in 1718. After the death of his father Franz Joseph, he took over his father's workshop in Mimmenhausen. At the same time, he became the "house sculptor" of the monastery in Salem, delivering for them his first commission, the organ case for the Salemer Münster.

Feuchtmayer was influenced by (among others) the Italian stuccoist Diego Francesco Carlone, with whom he worked in Weingarten. From him, he learned the production techniques for creating the stucco figures with highly polished surfaces that would make Feuchtmayer famous.

Alongside such notable artists as Johann Joseph Christian and Franz Joseph Spiegler, Feuchtmayer worked for the most part on the Baroque monastic churches along the Upper Swabian Baroque Route. His most well-known work is the putto on the Bernhardsaltar in Birnau called the "Honigschlecker" ("honey eater"), a reference St. Bernard's rhetorical gift.

Feuchtmayer's house and workshop in Mimmenhausen, near Salem, Bodensee, where he died, are now a museum dedicated to the life and work of the artist.

Major works
Beuron—Benedictine Abbey of St. Martin and St. Maria (high altar)
Meersburg—Chapel in the Neues Schloss (stucco)
St. Peter im Schwarzwald—St. Peter's Abbey in the Black Forest (sculptures on pillars, Apostle figures on altars)
Salem—Cistercian Abbey Church (four confessionals, organ case)
Uhldingen-Mühlhofen— Cistercian Priory of Birnau (window frames, Maria Immaculata, stucco, statue, altars, pulpit, altar figures, stations of the cross)
Überlingen—Franziskanerkirche (high altar)
Weingarten—Benedictine Monastery of St. Martin of Tours and St. Oswald (choir stalls)
Wurznach—Catholic Parish Church of St. Verena (figures on high altar)
Zeil, near Leutkirch im Allgäu—Catholic Parish Church of Mariä Himmelfahrt (high altar)

References

1696 births
1770 deaths
German sculptors
German male sculptors
German Baroque sculptors
Swiss Baroque sculptors
Artists from Linz
Catholic sculptors